FW may stand for:

Arts and entertainment
Fates Warning, an American progressive metal band
Frei.Wild, a German-language rock band from Brixen, Italy
Fair Warning (Van Halen album), an album by hard rock band, Van Halen
Fairy Wars, the 12.8th game in the Touhou Project series
Fish Wrangler, a Facebook game

Businesses
FatWire, a vendor of configuration management software
Focke-Wulf, a German aircraft manufacturer
F+W, a media and e-commerce company

In computing
FatWire, a vendor of configuration management software
Firewall (computing), a security device in computer networks
FireWire, a high speed serial interface standard
Adobe Fireworks, a graphics editing program
Firmware, software that is embedded in a hardware device
Email forwarding, in email subject lines ("Fwd" is sometimes used as well)
FrostWire, a P2P client

Places
Fort Worth, Texas
Fort Wayne, Indiana
Federal Way, Washington

Sport
Faceoffs Won, in ice hockey
Flash Wolves, a Taiwanese esports team
Forward (association football), a position in association football (soccer)

Other uses
 F. W. de Klerk (1936–2021), President of South Africa
Fashion week, an annual event in the fashion industry
Feldwebel, a German military rank
Fighter aircraft wing, in the United States Air Force
Fireworks
First wall, in nuclear fusion
Formula Weight, the molecular weight of an organic chemical in daltons
Free Voters, a German association of persons participating in an election without being a registered political party
Ibex Airlines IATA Airlines Code

See also

 
 
 WF (disambiguation)
 F (disambiguation)
 W (disambiguation)
 FVV (disambiguation)